The men's 94 kg competition of the weightlifting events at the 2015 Pan American Games in Toronto, Canada, was held on July 14 at the Oshawa Sports Centre. The defending champion was Javier Venega from Cuba.

Schedule
All times are Eastern Daylight Time (UTC-4).

Results
11 athletes from ten countries took part.

References

External links
Weightlifting schedule

Weightlifting at the 2015 Pan American Games